Augusto J. "Goose" Perez (born November 9, 1972) is a retired Spanish American wheelchair curler. He was the 2008 USA Curling Male Athlete of the Year and was on the bronze medal team at the 2008 World Wheelchair Curling Championships. He graduated from Le Moyne College. In addition to curling he has also competed in kayak and canoe. He was selected to be skip of the United States team at the 2010 Winter Paralympics.

In 2009, he was inducted into the International Canoe Hall of Fame.

References

External links
 
 
Profile at the Official Website for the 2010 Winter Paralympics in Vancouver

1972 births
Living people
American male curlers
American wheelchair curlers
Paralympic wheelchair curlers of the United States
Wheelchair curlers at the 2006 Winter Paralympics
Wheelchair curlers at the 2010 Winter Paralympics
Le Moyne College alumni
Sportspeople from Madrid
Spanish emigrants to the United States